Pisinae is a subfamily of crabs in the family Epialtidae, comprising the following genera:

 Acanthophrys A. Milne-Edwards, 1865
 Anamathia Smith, 1885
 Apias Rathbun, 1897
 Apiomithrax Rathbun, 1897
 Austrolibinia Griffin, 1966
 Chorilia Dana, 1851
 Chorilibinia Lockington, 1877
 Chorinus Latreille, 1825
 Delsolaria Garth, 1973
 Doclea Leach, 1815
 Garthinia Richer de Forges & Ng, 2009
 Giranauria Griffin & Tranter, 1986
 Goniopugettia Sakai, 1986
 Guinotinia Richer de Forges & Ng, 2009
 Herbstia H. Milne-Edwards, 1834
 Holoplites Rathbun, 1894
 Hoplophrys Henderson, 1893
 Hoploplites Rathbun, 1894
 Hyastenus White, 1847
 Lahaina Dana, 1851
 Laubierinia Richer de Forges & Ng, 2009
 Lepidonaxia Targioni-Tozzetti, 1872
 Lepteces Rathbun, 1893
 Leptomaia Griffin & Tranter, 1986
 Libidoclaea H. Milne-Edwards & Lucas, 1842
 Libinia Leach, 1815
 Lissa Leach, 1815
 Loxorhynchus Stimpson, 1857
 Lyramaia Griffin & Tranter, 1986
 Micippoides A. Milne-Edwards, 1873
 Microlissa Pretzmann, 1961
 Micropisa Stimpson, 1858
 Nasutocarcinus Tavares, 1991
 Naxioides A. Milne-Edwards, 1865
 Neodoclea Buitendijk, 1950
 Nibilia A. Milne-Edwards, 1878
 Nicoya Wicksten, 1987
 Notolopas Stimpson, 1871
 Oplopisa A. Milne-Edwards, 1879
 Oxypleurodon Miers, 1886
 Pelia Bell, 1835
 Phalangipus Latreille, 1828
 Pisa Leach, 1814
 Pisoides H. Milne-Edwards & Lucas, 1843
 Rhinocarcinus Richer de Forges & Ng, 2009
 Rochinia A. Milne-Edwards, 1875
 Scyra Dana, 1852
 Sphenocarcinus A. Milne-Edwards, 1875
 Stegopleurodon Richer de Forges & Ng, 2009
 Thusaenys Griffin & Tranter, 1986
 Trachymaia A. Milne-Edwards, 1880
 Tylocarcinus Miers, 1879

References

Majoidea
Arthropod subfamilies